Vasile Stati (born 1939) is a Moldovan politician and historian.

Biography 

He studied history and philology at the Moldovan language Department of the State University of Chişinău.

Stati wrote the monographs Moldovenii de la est de Nistru ("The Moldavians to the east of the Dniester") and Istoria Moldovei ("History of Moldova"). He has written about the development of the vernacular Moldavian language and the Slavic influences over the Moldavian culture. In the 1980s, he worked at the Institute of Linguistics and Literature of the Academy of Sciences of Moldova, and from 1994 to 2001 he was a member of the Moldovan Parliament. Until 2005 he was the secretary of the informational-analytic centre of the Moldovan Parliament.

In 2003, he published a Moldovan–Romanian dictionary with a foreword whose purpose was to prove that the Moldovan language is distinct from Romanian. The linguists of the Romanian Academy declared that Stati's "Moldovan" words are also Romanian words, while Ion Bărbuţă, the head of the Institute of Linguistics of the Republic of Moldova, described the dictionary as being an "absurdity, serving political goals".

Engaged in the history of Moldova and the Moldovan language. He is a supporter of Moldovenism - theories about the identity of the Moldovan language in relation to the Romanian.

The author of numerous publications on the history of Moldova. In 2003 he published the first Moldovan-Romanian dictionary, which caused a wave of criticism from the Romanian and Moldovan scientific and political circles, as contrary to the dominant current paradigm of the unity of the two languages.

See also
 History of the Moldovan language

References

  "Eforturi de îmbunătăţire a relaţiilor româno-moldoveneşti" ("Efforts to improve Romanian-Moldovan relations"), BBC Romanian, 27 May 2004
  "Un monument al minciunii şi al urii - 'Dicţionarul moldovenesc-românesc' al lui Vasile Stati ("A monument to lies and hatred - Vasile Stati's 'Moldovan-Romanian Dictionary'"), Contrafort, July 2003

Moldova State University alumni
Linguists from Moldova
Moldovan people of Russian descent
20th-century Moldovan historians
Living people
Anti-Romanian sentiment
Moldovan MPs 1994–1998
Moldovan MPs 1998–2001
1939 births